Euploea usipetes is a butterfly in the family Nymphalidae. It was described by William Chapman Hewitson in 1858. It is endemic to New Guinea and neighbouring Cape York Peninsula in the Australasian realm.

Subspecies
E. u. usipetes (New Guinea, Aru, Papua, Yule Island, Cape York, Thursday Island).
E. u. rezia (Kirby, 1894) (West Irian, New Guinea - Papua, Yule Island, Samarai, Goodenough, Fergusson Island).

References

External links
Euploea at Markku Savela's Lepidoptera and Some Other Life Forms

Euploea
Butterflies described in 1858